El Sistema (which translates to The System) is a publicly financed, voluntary sector, music-education program, founded in Venezuela in 1975 by Venezuelan educator, musician, and activist José Antonio Abreu. It later adopted the motto "Music for Social Change." El Sistema-inspired programs provide what the International Journal of Applied Psychoanalytic Studies describes as "free classical music education that promotes human opportunity and development for impoverished children." By 2015, according to official figures, El Sistema included more than 400 music centers and 700,000 young musicians. The original program in Venezuela involves four after-school hours of musical training and rehearsal each week, plus additional work on the weekends. Most El Sistema-inspired programs in the United States provide seven or more hours of instruction per week, as well as free use of an instrument.

Origin and history

El Sistema began under the leadership of José Antonio Abreu (7 May 1939 – 24 March 2018) with 11 students in an underground parking garage. For many years, its official name was Fundación del Estado para el Sistema Nacional de las Orquestas Juveniles e Infantiles de Venezuela, (FESNOJIV), which is sometimes translated into English as "National Network of Youth and Children's Orchestras of Venezuela." The organizations has recently changed its name to Fundación Musical Simón Bolívar (FMSB), but is still widely known by the FESNOJIV acronym.

Abreu's vision
Abreu has said that "music has to be recognized as an agent of social development in the highest sense because it transmits the highest values – solidarity, harmony, mutual compassion," crediting it with the ability to "unite an entire community and express sublime feelings."

Abreu led the program for nearly four decades with the backing and material support of seven consecutive Venezuelan governments, ranging across the political spectrum from center-right to the current leftist presidency installed by Hugo Chávez although Abreu has been "careful to keep El Sistema separate from partisan politics."

Play and fight

"Play and Fight" was the title of the El Nacional news story about the National System of Youth and Children's Orchestras of Venezuela that appeared on 2 February 1976. The organization soon adopted that phrase as its motto, expressing its members' determination and commitment to El Sistema as a vital and critical project, both orchestrally and socially.

Success stories
Gustavo Dudamel, current musical director of the Los Angeles Philharmonic and Paris Opera, had his musical beginnings in El Sistema. According to Dudamel, "music saved my life and has saved the lives of thousands of at-risk children in Venezuela...like food, like health care, like education, music has to be a right for every citizen."
Rafael Payare was hired as music director of San Diego Symphony and Orchestre symphonique de Montréal
Christian Vásquez became chief conductor of the Stavanger Symphony Orchestra
In 2011 Diego Matheuz was appointed as principal conductor by La Fenice Theater of Venice
Giancarlo Guerrero is the musical director of the Nashville Symphony
Since 2015 Carlos Izcaray is the conductor of the Alabama Symphony Orchestra
 Rodolfo Saglimbeni in 2019 was appointed as Principal Conductor of the National Symphony Orchestra of Chile
 César Iván Lara is the Principal Conductor of the Philharmonic Orchestra of Mendoza (Argentina)
 In 2019 Giancarlo Castro D'Addona became the conductor of the Reed College orchestra being the first Latin American conductor to obtain this position
Alexis Cardenas is violin concert master of L'Orchestre national d'Île-de-France in París
Edward Pulgar is Principal Second Violin of the Knoxville Symphony Orchestra
Giovanni Guzzo teaches violin at the Royal Academy of Music in London and is principal guest leader of the Budapest Festival Orchestra
Gustavo Núñez served as principal bassoon of the Amsterdam Royal Concertgebouw Orchestra
Jaime Martínez is principal oboe of the Orquesta Filarmónica de Medellín
Sergio Rosales conducted orchestras in Colombia, Belgium, Japan, and United States
Double-bass player Edicson Ruiz became the youngest musician ever to join the Berlin Philharmonic Orchestra
Tulio Cremisini is the Principal Timpanist with Miami Symphony Orchestra
Paul Desenne cellist since 2016 he is Composer in Residence with the Alabama Symphony Orchestra
Pedro Eustache is a multidirectional soloist flautist, and world-class reed and woodwind player
Alcides Rodriguez, a clarinetist with the Atlanta Symphony Orchestra, has said that "the System was an open door to another dimension, a different world that I probably could have never seen."
On 4 September 2016 Paul Desenne's work Hipnosis mariposa was premiered at The BBC Proms by Simón Bolívar Symphony Orchestra conducted by Gustavo Dudamel.
Domingo Hindoyan is the Chief Conductor of the Royal Liverpool Philharmonic Orchestra.

Venezuelan government involvement
The program has a reputation for rescuing young people in impoverished circumstances, directing them away from lives of drug abuse and crime, into which they would likely otherwise be drawn.

The Venezuelan government of President Carlos Andrés Pérez began fully financing Abreu's orchestra after its success, in 1976, at the "International Festival of Youth Orchestras" in Aberdeen, Scotland. From the beginning, El Sistema came not under the ministry of culture, but under the umbrella of social-services ministries, which has strategically helped it survive. The current Chavez administration has been El Sistema's most generous patron so far, covering almost its entire annual operating budget, as well as additional capital projects.
Abreu received the National Music Prize for his work in 1979 and became Minister of Culture in 1983. In 1995, Abreu was appointed Special Ambassador for the Development of a Global Network of Youth and Children Orchestras and Choirs by UNESCO. He also became a special representative for the development of orchestras within the framework of UNESCO's "World Movement of Youth and Children Orchestras and Choirs."

At the time, its network of 102 youth and 55 children's orchestras (including approximately 100,000 youngsters) came under the supervision of the Ministry of Family, Health and Sports. A goal of El Sistema is to use music for the protection of children through training, rehabilitation, and prevention of criminal behavior.

In September 2007, with Abreu present on the television talk-show, Aló Presidente, the president Hugo Chávez announced a new government program, Misión Música, designed to provide tuition and music instruments to Venezuelan children. It has been noted that "various ministries oversaw El Sistema until two years ago, when the president's office took direct control. El Sistema's mission runs parallel to Mr. Chávez's program to provide subsidies and services to the poor." There have been objections, however, to Chavez's involvement from those who oppose the policies of the present government.

Spread of regional centres in Venezuela
On 6 June 2007, the Inter-American Development Bank announced the granting of a US$150 million loan for the construction of seven regional centers of El Sistema throughout Venezuela. Many bankers within the IDB originally objected to the loan on the grounds that classical music is for the elite. But then the bank has conducted studies on the more than 2,000,000 young people, educated in El Sistema, linking participation in the program to improvements in school attendance and reduction in juvenile delinquency and crime rates. Weighing such benefits, the bank calculated that every dollar invested in El Sistema was reaping about $1.68 in social dividends. Supported by the government, El Sistema started introducing its music program into the public-school curriculum, aiming to be in every school and to support 500,000 children by 2015.

The project has also been extended to the penal system. On 25 May 2008, Leidys Asuaje wrote for Venezuelan daily El Nacional: "The plan to humanize jails through music began 11 months ago under the tutelage of the Ministry of the Interior and Justice and FESNOJIV...."

However, a journalistic investigation in 2022 revealed that the regional centers funded by the IDB were never built and therefore the bank's long-term project to decentralize El Sistema had failed.

Controversy
In November 2014, British music scholar Geoffrey Baker published a newspaper article and a book that disputed many of the claims made by and about El Sistema and suggested that much of the publicly circulating information about the program was hyperbolic or simply false. The book's allegations included a culture of authoritarianism, hyper-discipline, exploitation, competition, and gender discrimination. It argued that the program was deeply conservative beneath its progressive exterior and that its claims of social transformation were unproven and exaggerated. For example, Baker's work alleges that the IADB's claim that El Sistema was reaping about $1.68 in social dividends for each $1 invested was based on dubious calculations and had been withdrawn by the bank itself. Considerable controversy ensued, with furious denunciations by Sistema advocates and enthusiastic responses from music education experts. In his review of Baker's book, Damian Thompson, arts editor for The Spectator highlighted Baker's contention that the rampant sexual abuse of young musicians in El Sistema is part of "classical music's dirty little secret."

Baker's research was validated in a 2016 article by Lawrence Scripp and the former El Sistema violinist Luigi Mazzocchi, and it was further supported by the appearance of previously unpublished external evaluations of El Sistema dating from the late 1990s, which confirmed many of the issues observed by Baker. Political controversy mounted from 2014 as Abreu and Dudamel's close relationship to the Venezuelan government came under increasing scrutiny, with the pianist Gabriela Montero becoming their most prominent critic. In 2017, the claims in many official El Sistema sources that Abreu held a PhD from the United States were proven to be false. 2021 saw further claims of widespread sexual harassment and abuse within El Sistema, this time directly from alleged victims. El Sistema was finally obliged to acknowledge the issue, and several overseas affiliates (including Sistema England and Sistema Scotland) issued critical public responses. In 2022, El Sistema's failure to build any of the seven regional centers funded by the IDB - an issue raised repeatedly by Baker over the previous eight years - was documented and published by a team of Venezuelan journalists.

Simon Bolivar Orchestra

An important product of El Sistema is the Simon Bolivar Symphony Orchestra. 
In the mid-1990s, Abreu formed the National Children's Youth Orchestra, and many young musicians graduated from it to the Simón Bolívar which grew considerably in size. This became an opportunity to re-create the ensemble as two separate performing entities. The first generation of members was designated the Simón Bolívar A; the younger, newer members, who had recently been brought in from the new National Children's Orchestra, now constituted the Simón Bolívar B" The Simón Bolívar B is now the touring orchestra and, in 2007, made its debut at the BBC Proms in London's Royal Albert Hall and later at Carnegie Hall under the baton of Gustavo Dudamel, receiving enthusiastic reviews. 2009 saw the orchestra touring in the US, but also in Europe as well.

In the spring of 2010, however, a tour to the Lucerne Easter Festival drew comments from reviewers, such as Tom Service of London's The Guardian, that the Simón Bolívar Youth Orchestra was "youthful no longer." This struck home, and Abreu decided, as he put it, "the time is once again ripe for new, younger national orchestras." And so, he set about creating new ensembles. The Teresa Carreño Symphony Youth Orchestra, named for the famous Venezuelan pianist, started international touring in the autumn of 2010 with appearances at the Beethoven Fest in Bonn, followed by Vienna, Berlin, Salzburg Festival, Milan, Amsterdam, Madrid, and London. Other new youth orchestras include the Caracas Symphony Youth Orchestra and a newly constituted National Children's Orchestra consisting of 358 musicians.

In other countries

United States
El Sistema USA is a membership organization, which supports and encourages more than 80 El Sistema-inspired programs throughout the United States, a number which are growing rapidly. Its philosophy and aspirations are expressed on its website:
A visionary global movement that transforms the lives of children through music. A new model for social change.

Abreu appeared in a public symposium on El Sistema on 7 November 2007 in Boston, Massachusetts, where he gave the keynote speech of the public symposium on El Sistema on the WGBH Forum Network. A significant panel of speakers was present.

At the November 2007 symposium, Abreu expressed delight at the prospect of joining with the Conservatory Lab Charter School in Boston and other musical institutions in the United States to create a Pan-American movement. "The New World," he said, "is nothing less than all three Americas. And so what we are in the process of creating is really an expression of a new, transcontinental social and musical culture." The Conservatory Lab school is associated with the New England Conservatory of Music, and was the first El Sistema-infused charter school in Massachusetts.

It has been estimated that there were five or six El Sistema-based programs in the US in early 2009, but "by mid-2011, there were at least 50 such programs – and list is increasing by the week..." In addition, many of the original Abreu Fellows who came together at the New England Conservatory as a result of Abreu's TED Prize, have gone into their local communities to start new programs or to expand upon or within existing ones.  These cover a wide geographical area ranging from Kidznotes in North Carolina, JAMM (Juneau Alaska Music Matters) in that state, and ICAN (Incredible Children's Art Network) in Santa Barbara, California. In 2011, Longy School of Music of Bard College, Bard College, and the Los Angeles Philharmonic formed Take a Stand to promote and support the El Sistema-inspired music education movement in the United States. Based in Los Angeles, it also offers a graduate-level degree program based on the tenets of El Sistema, including Master of Arts in Teaching in Music degree.

First Notes in Vail Valley, Colorado; CityMusic in Cleveland, Ohio; Club O in Fort Wayne, Indiana; Kid Ovation program in Des Moines, Iowa; and Orchestrating Diversity in Saint Louis, Missouri are also inspired by El Sistema.

Other El Sistema-inspired programs in the US include:

Atlanta Music Project (Atlanta, Georgia) is sponsored by major companies and foundations of the city. It is managed by two Sistema Fellows, graduates of the 2010 and 2012 Program at the New England Conservatory of Music. The Atlanta Music Project offers both an orchestral and a choral music program.
Austin Soundwaves (Austin, Texas) was founded in 2011 by Sistema Fellow and executive director, Patrick Slevin, focusing on the artistically underserved community of east Austin. Programming takes place primarily in-school with a variety of offerings, including concert band, string orchestra, philharmonic orchestra chamber music, and mariachi.
Boston String Academy (Boston, Massachusetts) founded in 2012 by Taide Preito, Marielisa Alverez, and Mariesther Alverez, Boston String Academy is a El Sistema-based program. The founders started their journey through El Sistema in Venezuela. Previously working at Kids 4 Harmony, they were inspired to start an El Sistema inspired program in Boston. BSA offers three programs, those being in Chinatown and Allston neighborhoods, serving more than 120 students. 
B Sharp Youth Music Program (Fort Worth, Texas) is a free extended-day music program founded in 2010 at Como Elementary, funded by The Goff Family Foundation in partnership with the Fort Worth Independent School District. As the Fort Worth ISD's only elementary orchestra and the only El Sistema-inspired music program in North Texas, B Sharp fosters positive youth development through ensemble-based music instruction, peer-to-peer teaching, emphasis on group music-making, life skills training and the social aspect of learning music.
BRAVO Youth Orchestras (Portland, Oregon) began in 2013. BRAVO is an independent non-profit organization. While it is independent it relies on partnerships to be able to provide vocal and instrumental classes. It partners with Portland Public Schools to provide in-school music classes; then partners with SUN and Boys & Girls Club for its after-school programs.
Chicago Metamorphosis Orchestra Project (ChiMOP) (Chicago, Illinois) was founded in May 2013 by Thomas Madeja and Sylvia Carlson. Its first program, the ChiMOP Summer Youth Orchestra, is an advanced youth orchestra that is designed to bridge the gap between academic year programs. ChiMOP's second program, Mary Lyon Music, is an El Sistema inspired program that takes place at Mary Lyon Elementary School in Chicago's Belmont Cragin neighborhood and was launched in September 2013.
El Sistema Lehigh Valley (ESLV) (Allentown, Pennsylvania) was founded in 2011 as a free music education program through the Allentown Symphony Association.  Since starting with less than 70 students on paper instruments, the program has expanded to provide orchestral and choir instruction to more than 100 students from the elementary to high school level.
Harmony Program (New York City) was one of the first El Sistema-inspired programs in the US. It began as a pilot program in the New York City Mayor's Office in 2003. After being incorporated as an independent non-profit, the Harmony Program was re-launched under its current model in 2008 through a partnership with the City University of New York. The program was founded by Anne Fitzgibbon, who studied El Sistema in Venezuela on a year-long Fulbright Fellowship.
Kids 4 Harmony (Pittsfield, Massachusetts) was launched in 2012 by Berkshire Children and Families, a social services organization and is based at the Morningside School in Pittsfield. The Berkshire Symphony Orchestra, Boston Conservatory, and Longy School of Music have supported the program with periodic tutoring and public fundraising performances. Another branch of the program is located in (North Adams, Massachusetts).
Kidznotes (North Carolina) was launched in 2007 by co-founders Katie Wyatt and Lucia Powe. They serve over 400 students in the Raleigh-Durham area but are expanding. They offer orchestra, band, and choir programs for children grades K–12.
Miami Music Project (Miami, Florida) was founded in 2008 by James Judd with chapters in Doral, Little Haiti, and Liberty City. 
MYCincinnati (Cincinnati, Ohio) is a free youth orchestra program. It was founded in October 2011 by a graduate of the second class of Sistema Fellows at New England Conservatory. The program has a full string orchestra of over 70 students who meet for two hours a day, five days a week. In addition, the program added winds in 2017. 
Orchestrating Diversity (Saint Louis, Missouri) was founded in 2009 by Mark Sarich, Max Woods and Jesse Windels as a free music program for inner-city youth based at the Lemp Neighborhood Arts Center. Orchestrating Diversity offers an intensive eight-week summer program as well as after-school classes throughout the school year, teaching students college-level music theory, history, and musicianship. Students also perform symphonic music as an ensemble, and are given private instruction on their instruments from professional musicians, college faculty members, and student volunteers from nearby universities. 
OrchKids (Baltimore, Maryland) is an after-school program at the Luckerman Bundy Elementary School which brings "intensive music education to very young children" one of its distinctive features According to Nick Skinner, director of operations for OrchKids, it concentrates on both the musical and the social: "(the children) learn that being an OrchKid means behaving in a certain way". The Baltimore Symphony Orchestra is involved in the program and its conductor, Marin Alsop, conducts concerts with the young group.
Paterson Music Project (Paterson, New Jersey) is an El Sistema-inspired after-school program initiated by the Wharton Institute for the Performing Arts. PMP began at the Community Charter School of Paterson in January 2013 and has expanded to two Paterson public schools. In 2016, PMP launched a Saturday Community Arts Program to serve the broader Paterson community with a community orchestra and intergenerational choir.
People's Music School Youth Orchestras (Chicago, Illinois) (formerly known as the YOURS Project) was founded in 2008 as the first El Sistema-inspired program in Chicago. Using donated instruments and makeshift accessories, the Youth Orchestra began with 35 students and grew to serve over 135 students annually by 2014. The first in its network of youth orchestras is located at the William G. Hibbard Elementary School in Chicago's Albany Park neighborhood. 
Pinecrest City Music Project (PCMP) (Miami, Florida) Founded by current Brown University student Daniel Solomon, PCMP is an El Sistema-inspired arts education program that educates public school students to become holistic arts leaders, both in and outside the classroom. With 502 students and 31 student-staff, PCMP operates, funds, and instructs 8 weekly arts education programs, and organizes 3 annual large-scale public arts initiatives, free-of-charge. PCMP is the first student-led nonprofit grants recipient of Miami-Dade County, State of Florida, and the only student-run instructional contractor to the Miami-Dade School Board. PCMP is driven by the principle that every child should have access to a high-quality music education that not only encourages them as musicians, but utilizes the arts as a vehicle for social change. 
Play on Philly! (POP) (Philadelphia, Pennsylvania) started in 2011 with 110 underserved children (grades 1 to 8) in St. Francis de Sales, a West Philadelphia school.  Another site at the Freire Charter Middle School, established in September 2010, brought the total number of students to close to 250. In addition to group instrumental lessons children study composition, general music, choir, chamber and ensemble music.  POP employs 31 teaching artists.  A major part of the program is a series of 30 concerts in the community throughout the year as well as visits from guest artists and conductors.
Q the Music (Dayton, Ohio) was founded in September 2012 through the Dayton Philharmonic Orchestra. The program serves around 70 students in Grades 3 through 6 at Ruskin Elementary, a Dayton Public School.
Shift: Englewood Youth Orchestra (Chicago, Illinois) was founded in July 2014 by Larry Gerber, Ayriole Frost and Albert Oppenheimer. It serves children grades 3 through 8 in the Englewood neighborhood of Chicago, and takes place at Wentworth Elementary School.
Soundscapes (Newport News, Virginia) was founded in 2009 and opened its first nucleo at Carver Elementary.  In 2012 the program opened its second nucleo at Downing-Gross Cultural Arts Center.
UpBeat NYC (Bronx, New York) was established in 2009. It is a free community music program in the Mott Haven neighborhood of the South Bronx.  Its activities include an orchestra program for ages 8 and up providing lessons, sectionals, and ensemble rehearsals, a beginner violin orchestra that transitions children from paper orchestra to real instruments and prepares students for the orchestra program, and a pre-orchestra program for ages 5–7 that implements Kodály methodology and a paper orchestra curriculum. The majority of UpBeat's staff are volunteer musicians.
Union City Music Project (UCMP) (Union City, New Jersey) is the first El Sistema program in the New Jersey. The UCMP launched operations in March 2012 through a Paper Orchestra. It has support from volunteer parents but all teaching artists are paid.
WHIN Music Project (Washington Heights-Inwood, New York) was founded by El Sistema Fellow David Gracia in August 2012. WHIN offers string orchestra and choir, early childhood music classes, as well as satellite programs in schools and daycare centers. Students receive masterclasses as well as opportunities to peer mentor. 
Yakima Music en Acción (YAMA) (Yakima, Washington) was founded by Sistema Fellow Stephanie Hsu in 2013 and currently serves 68 at-promise children at Garfield Elementary School in the Yakima Valley, ages 8 to 14. YAMA functions as an active community partnership between the Yakima Symphony Orchestra, the Yakima School District, and a robust group of involved parents. 
YOLA (Youth Orchestra of Los Angeles) (Los Angeles, California) is a partnership between the Los Angeles Philharmonic, Harmony Project, EXPO Center, a City of Los Angeles Department of Recreation and Parks facility, Heart of Los Angeles (HOLA), and Los Angeles County High School for the Arts (LACHSA).  The orchestra receives artistic direction from the Los Angeles Philharmonic via conductor Juan Felipe Molano and LA Phil Music Director Gustavo Dudamel, who has led the orchestra at Walt Disney Concert Hall and the Hollywood Bowl. In the Super Bowl 50 halftime show the YOLA directed by Dudamel joined the members of Coldplay to perform "Viva la Vida", "Paradise", and "Adventure of a Lifetime". With the support of Yola, Global Arts has a similar mission of El Sistema, but strives to take it one step further by providing the same developmental and nurturing environment for educators as well as students with host classes and workshops for families and community members. Global Arts serves in the Pico Union District of Los Angeles and eventually expand to neighborhoods in Los Angeles, and throughout the US and other countries.
YOLA National Festival (Youth Orchestra Los Angeles National Festival) (Los Angeles, California) Previously known as National Take a Stand Festival, YOLA National Festival is an intensive summer learning program for the top-tier musicians aged 12–18 of El Sistema in America, the program has an acceptance rate of less than twenty percent. Student musicians of this program perform at Walt Disney Concert Hall with Gustavo Dudamel for their annual performance.YOLA National Festival is provided free of cost covering air-travel, boarding, instruction, etc. The Los Angeles Philharmonic funds the program. In October 2021, YOLA opened its own music hall: The Judith and Thomas L. Beckmen YOLA Center in Inglewood, designed by architect Frank Gehry.
YOSA (Youth Orchestra of San Antonio)  (San Antonio, Texas) is located in the "Good Sam" Community Services Center in West San Antonio and run by an expatriate Briton, Steven Payne. YOSA has five orchestras and 450 students. It also has the financial support of a local businessman, Al Silva, a man of Mexican heritage who grew up the area.
Young Musician Initiative (YMI)  (Albuquerque, New Mexico) is a youth outreach arm of the New Mexico Philharmonic, and is run by Matt Hart. Begun in January 2013, YMI offers instrumental and choral education to K-7th grade students in select Title 1 schools in Albuquerque.

Canada
El Sistema-based programs exist in almost every province of Canada, with over 20 programs in existence and more being started each year.

El Sistema Aeolian (London, Ontario) was established in November 2011 and grew out of The Aeolian Performing Arts Centre, in London, Ontario. It serves approximately 75 students attracted from the greater London area. Currently, the program runs 4 days per week and includes youth string orchestra, choir, an adult orchestra, a full meal/snack, Indonesian gamelan, free donated pianos/lessons and gives between 15 and 20 performances per year.

El Sistema South London (ESSL) (London, Ontario and St. Thomas, Ontario) was established in 2012 serving students at two South London schools.  In 2018, the program expanded to serve schools in St. Thomas, Ontario. Also in 2018, a new program entitled Ability Through Drumming was established to provide drumming lessons to children in London with physical and developmental disabilities.

OrKidstra (Ottawa, Ontario) was established in October 2007. It serves 400 students from Centretown inner-city schools through in-school programming (150 students) and after school programming (250 students). The program is made possible through its many partnerships with local community supporters like: OCDSB, and the National Arts Centre.

Saint James Music Academy (Vancouver, British Columbia) Canada's first El-sistema program, was established in September 2007. It serves 480 students from Downtown Eastside inner-city schools through its outreach (280 students) and after school program (200 students). The program is an official community partner of the Vancouver Symphony Orchestra.

Sistema Kingston is a program based at Molly Brant Elementary School in Kingston, Ontario. The program's partnership includes The Dan School of Drama & Music at Queen's University and the Joe Chithalen Memorial Music Instrument Lending Library (Joe's MILL).

Sistema New Brunswick (Moncton, New Brunswick) A program of the New Brunswick Youth Orchestra, Sistema NB was started in 2009 in Moncton and has since grown to include centres all across the province. It is an intensive music education program engaging more than 1,200 children and youth, 2-3 hours after school, 5 days per week during the school year. It comprises a network of 1) local children’s orchestras in 9 communities throughout the province of New Brunswick, 2) regional youth orchestras, and 3) a renowned provincial youth orchestra. Sistema NB serves urban and rural communities, operates in both English and French, and engages children and youth from under-resourced, indigenous and newcomer communities. In 2021, Sistema NB launched ’10,000 Children’, with a goal and plan to more than double in size and to engage 10,000 children and youth in New Brunswick over the life of the plan. Sistema NB is generously supported by the Province of New Brunswick and many individuals, businesses, charitable foundations and others.

Sistema Toronto was founded in 2011 by businessman and community activist Robert Eisenberg. Sistema Toronto's first centre opened at Parkdale Junior and Senior Public School; the second opened in 2013 at Jane/Finch's Yorkwoods Public School. Sistema Toronto has since opened two centres at Military Trail Public School and St. Martin de Porres Catholic School in Scarborough's Kingston-Galloway-Orton Park neighbourhood.  As of 2017, enrollment is 240 children aged 6–13.

Sistema Winnipeg was started in 2011 as a partnership between the Winnipeg Symphony Orchestra, Winnipeg School Division, and Sevenoaks School Division. The programme runs every day after school for approximately 130 students, and includes a meal, choir, orchestra, and social programming. Sistema Winnipeg performs regularly with the Winnipeg Symphony Orchestra and is led by Music Director Naomi Woo, also assistant conductor of the Winnipeg Symphony Orchestra.

YONA-Sistema (Youth Orchestra of Northern Alberta – Sistema) (Edmonton, Alberta) was established in September 2013. It serves students at Delton School and Mother Teresa Elementary School in Edmonton, Alberta and is offered through a partnership between the Edmonton Symphony Orchestra, the Edmonton Catholic School District, the Edmonton Public School Board, and the Inner City Children's Program.

United Kingdom
In Harmony is a British government-led music education and community development project which is based on El Sistema It was begun in 2009 with Julian Lloyd Webber appointed chairman of its steering group.  The project receives funding from the Department for Education and Arts Council England. On 22 November 2007, Julian Lloyd Webber noted the following in regard to the UK government's announcement of an infusion of £332 million dedicated to music education:
We also have an impoverished South American nation to thank. Last August, in the midst of school holidays, when an uncomfortable number of British children seemed even more disaffected than usual, the Simon Bolivar Youth Orchestra arrived from Venezuela to deliver performances at the Edinburgh Festival and the London Proms that were, quite simply, miraculous"

Lloyd Webber visited Venezuela in late 2009 and reported on what he saw there. The project has centers in Lambeth (led by Lambeth Council's Children and Young People's Service), Leeds, (led by Opera North), Liverpool (led by the Royal Liverpool Philharmonic Orchestra), Newcastle Gateshead, (led by The Sage Gateshead), Nottingham, (led by Nottingham City Council), Norwich, (led by NORCA and Sistema in Norwich, and Telford and Stoke-on-Trent (led by Telford and Wrekin Music)

In 2013, El Sistema announced a partnership In Harmony, which will result in children from both England and Venezuela to work together in a series of music-making projects.

The Nucleo Project was founded by Lucy Maguire in February 2013, in a basement in Notting Hill. It is a social action programme in North Kensington that uses the pursuit of musical excellence as a way to enrich the lives of children, young people and their families. Beginning with five children, the project grew rapidly, with over 200 children of ages 2–18 in six different orchestras.

Sistema Scotland was established with a grant from the Scottish Arts Council in 2008, as a result of an initiative by its chairman Richard Holloway in the economically deprived area of Raploch, in Stirling. They run 'Big Noise' programmes across Scotland, which are high-quality music education and social change programmes that work intensively with children, young people and families within targeted communities. The charity now run six Big Noise programmes, in Raploch (Stirling), Govanhill (Glasgow), Torry (Aberdeen), Douglas (Dundee), Fallin (Stirling), and Wester Hailes (Edinburgh).

Portugal
Orquestra Geração (Generation Orchestra)

This name used to describe the 16 centres currently using it to reference activities throughout the country. It was started in 2005 in a small way in Amadora on the northern outskirts of Lisbon. It is now a solid project ready to expand and to influence Portuguese social inclusion methodology and government policy. Some 850 young people are now involved, in 16 schools in 11 towns: Loures, Oeiras, Sintra, Amadora, Sesimbra, Vila Franca de Xira, Lisboa, Coimbra, Amarante and Gondomar.

Philippines
Inspired by El Sistema, the Orchestra of the Filipino Youth, is the main arm of Ang Misyon Inc., an institution that supports and provide free music education to the less privileged and talented children in the Philippines.

Sistemang Pilipino in Cebu City began in spirit in October 2009, when the documentary film, Tocar Y Luchar was shown to a group of violin teachers. The organization was registered in January 2013 as a Non-Stock, Non-Profit organization, providing music instruction and values formation to children and youth from underserved communities in the Philippines, starting with Cebu in the Central Visayas Region. It has served five communities since summer of 2013, with an estimate of 500 students who have passed through its choir and string training programs. Website: www.sistemangpilipino.org

Colombia
The Fundación Nacional Batuta was founded in 1991, modelled on Venezuela's El Sistema. By 2020 over 500,000 children and young people had taken part in Batuta's musical programmes since its launch in 1991. After Venezuela, it is the largest such programme in the world.

Peru
Inspirated by El Sistema in 2011, the laureated tenor Juan Diego Flores started Symphony for Peru offering music classes and activities for children in low-income families, giving them a chance to develop their talent, teach them values through the arts and pull them away from at-risk situations.

Germany
Musaik – Grenzenlos Musizieren started in 2017 in Dresden-Prohlis on the initiative of the music educators Luise Börner and Deborah Oehler. The success and sustainability of the program (built on the philosophy of El Sistema) are based on the intensity of the lessons (three times a week), group lessons, community music making and ensemble work.

Uruguay

El Sistema supports  the "One Child, One Instrument" program  of Sodre National Youth Orchestra of Teatro Solis with teachers an directors.

International recognition of El Sistema
The Glenn Gould Prize was awarded to 
El Sistema founder José Antonio Abreu on 14 February 2008. Brian Levine, managing director of the Glenn Gould Foundation, in an account of his 2008 visit to Caracas wrote: "El Sistema has demonstrated conclusively that music education is the gateway to lifelong learning and a better future."

The Prince of Asturias Award for the Arts was awarded to El Sistema on 28 May 2008.

The National Performing Arts Convention 2008, held in Denver, Colorado, featured Abreu as a guest speaker on 13 June 2008.

The TED Prize was awarded to José Antonio Abreu on 5 February 2009 for his work on El Sistema.  A pre-recorded speech was played at the ceremony in which he explained his philosophy. The prize allowed for the creation of the Abreu Fellows.

The Polar Music Prize from Sweden was awarded to El Sistema and Maestro Abreu in 2009.

The Kellogg Institute for International Studies at the University of Notre Dame awarded Abreu the Notre Dame Prize for Distinguished Public Service in Latin America on 22 September 2014.

The Institute of Education, University of London awarded Abreu an honorary degree in 2013

In the media
The film has won several awards, including Best Documentary at both the 2007 Cine Las Americas International Film Festival and also the CineMás Albuquerque Latino Film Festival.
El Sistema, a 2008 documentary made by Paul Smaczny and Maria Stodtmeier about the system. Production: EuroArts Music Production, ARTE France, NHK. The film won the Best Documentary Feature Award at the Chicago International Movies and Music Festival in 2010 and Best Documentary at the Orlando Hispanic Film Festival in 2009.
Dudamel: Conducting a Life is an hour-long PBS program hosted by Tavis Smiley on the subject of music education in the United States, with a focus on Gustavo Dudamel and his achievements with the L.A. Philharmonic. The report includes a look at how the Boston Conservatory Lab Charter School works with children.
El Sistema: a report on CBS's 60 Minutes from 13 April 2008 which explores the "System" and includes interviews with some of the Venezuelan children who are members of an orchestra.
Crescendo! The Power of Music: is a 2014 documentary film about Sistema-inspired programs in Philadelphia and Harlem.
Mozart in the Jungle: the character of Rodrigo de Souza (played by Gael García Bernal) is loosely based on Gustavo Dudamel, the Venezuelan music director of the Los Angeles Philharmonic. Dudamel coached García Bernal before the latter conducted, in the character of Rodrigo, for a real performance of the Los Angeles Philharmonic at the Hollywood Bowl, scenes of which were used for the second season opener. Dudamel has a cameo in that episode, acting as a stagehand trying to convince Rodrigo to move to Los Angeles.
The Music Inside, which tells the stories of Kidznotes students, wins both a Telly and a regional Emmy Award for Documentary Short Film in 2016–17.

See also
 List of youth orchestras

References
Notes

Cited sources
Baker, Geoffrey, "El Sistema: Orchestrating Venezuela's Youth", Oxford University Press, 2014.
Tunstall, Tricia, Changing Lives: Gustavo Dudamel, El Sistema, and the Transformative Power of Music, New York: W.W. Norton & Co. 2012 
Wakin, Daniel J.,

External links 

Articles about El Sistema
Drew McManus, The Future of Classical Music is in Venezuela on partialobserver.com.
 "Part 1 of a trip to Caracas which led to a world of discovery", 4 July 2005 
 "Part 2: Learning about where this remarkable Venezuelan program of classical music comes from and where it's going", 18 July 2005 
 "Part 3: The process behind the Venezuelan program seems sound, but what about the artistic accomplishments?" 1 August 2005 
 "Part 4: The FESNOJIV program has achieved sound accomplishments but could the program work outside of Venezuela?" 15 August 2005 

Others
Official FESNOJIV website, in English
In Harmony Telford & Stoke on Trent blog

Foundations based in Venezuela
Music education organizations
 
Organizations established in 1975
1970s establishments in Venezuela
Music schools in Venezuela
Articles containing video clips